Jintong is a Taoist deity in Chinese mythology and Chinese traditional religion who, along with his female counterpart Yunü (Jade Girl), are favored servants of the Jade Emperor and Zhenwudadi.

They are also believed to serve as guides in the underworld and the protectors of houses and temples. Some of the Golden Boy and Jade Girl pair could be found on some graves at Bukit Brown Cemetery as they are believed to serve as guides in the Spirit World or the Underworld.

This couple helps virtuous souls over a golden bridge to paradise, and helps souls whose good deeds outweighed the bad, over a silver bridge to paradise. Therefore by erecting the Golden Boy and Jade Maiden by the grave of the deceased, living family members hope that the deceased will not venture into the courts of hell but instead lead their afterlife in paradise.

Legends
Golden Boy and Jade Girl have appeared in several stories since the Song and Yuan dynasties and have became important figures in Chinese mythology. Specific examples are the southern opera version of the legend, Jintong and Yunü, and Yuan dynasty writer Jia Zhongming's zaju by the same name.

In the Avatamsaka Sutra, he and Yunü seek enlightenment and are acolytes of Guan Yin. In this context, Yunü is called Longnü and Jintong is called Shancai Tongzi.

Some folktales say that Xue Dingshan and Fan Lihua were originally the Golden Boy and Jade Girl. The Jade Emperor was furious with them and wanted to punish them for breaking the celestial utensils. Fortunately, the Old Man of the South Pole begged for their mercy and was demoted to the mortal world.

In the Hanyi ji play, the protagonists Qi Liang and Meng Jiang are reincarnations of Jintong and Yunü.

In most popular versions of The Butterfly Lovers, the protagonists Liang Shanbo and Zhu Yingtai are human reincarnations of Jintong and Yunü who are expelled from Heaven Court by Guanyin or the Jade Emperor for their sin and forced to live as a thwarted couple for three or seven generations before being reunited and restored to their original status.

In popular culture
 Literary works often refer to attractive and well-matched couples as a Jintong and Yunü.
 During the Spring Festival, pictures featuring Yunü and Jintong can be found on the doors of many households.

References

Sources
Li Jianping 李劍平, ed. (1998). Zhongguo shenhua renwu cidian 中國神話人物辞典 (Xi'an : Shanxi renmin chubanshe), 144.

Chinese gods
Deities in Taoism